The 2011 FIM Speedway World Cup (SWC) was the eleventh FIM Speedway World Cup, the annual international speedway world championship tournament. It took place between 9 July and 16 July 2011 and involved eight national teams. Six teams were seeded through to the tournament and two qualification rounds were held in April and May 2011 to determine the final two places.

Qualification

Qualified teams

Tournament

Semi-finals

Race-off

Final 
(full details)

Final classification

See also
 2011 Speedway Grand Prix
 2011 Team Speedway Junior World Championship

References

External links
 SpeedwayWorld.tv (SWC news)

 
World Team
2011